A basilica is a form of large building.  

Basilica may also refer to:

Basilica (moth), a group of moths
Basilicas in the Catholic Church, an honorific given to certain churches in the Roman Catholic Church
Basilic vein, a vein in the arm; abbreviated V. basilica
 "Basilica", a 1995 song by Jawbreaker from Dear You

See also

 Basilica Cathedral (disambiguation)
Basilika, a collection of Byzantine law
 
 Basil (disambiguation)
 Basilicata, Italy